Brandon Agounon (born 19 October 1994) is a French professional footballer who plays as a midfielder for  club Orléans.

Club career
Agounon joined Clermont in 2012 from Caen. He made his Ligue 2 debut on 18 October 2013 against Nancy in a 3–2 away defeat. In August 2017, he was loaned to Boulogne for the 2017–18 season. He left in June 2018 to join Ermis Aradippou in Cyprus.

In June 2019, Agounon returned to France with Villefranche. In July 2020, he signed a two-year deal with Bourg-en-Bresse. In 2022, Agounon joined Orléans.

International career 
Agounon has previously been called up by youth teams of DR Congo.

References

External links

1994 births
Living people
Footballers from Caen
Association football defenders
French footballers
French sportspeople of Democratic Republic of the Congo descent
Black French sportspeople
Citizens of the Democratic Republic of the Congo through descent
Democratic Republic of the Congo footballers
Ligue 2 players
Championnat National players
Championnat National 2 players
Championnat National 3 players
Stade Malherbe Caen players
Clermont Foot players
US Boulogne players
Ermis Aradippou FC players
FC Villefranche Beaujolais players
Football Bourg-en-Bresse Péronnas 01 players
US Orléans players